Jason X.-J. Yuan (born 1963) is an American physician scientist whose research interests center on pulmonary vascular pathobiology and pulmonary hypertension. His current research is primarily focused on the pathogenic mechanisms of pulmonary vascular diseases and right heart failure.

Biography and career 
He was born in 1963 in Xintian County, Hunan Province, China. Yuan completed his medical training at the Suzhou Medical College in 1983, and received his doctoral degree from the Chinese Academy of Medical Sciences and Peking Union Medical College in 1993. He completed his postdoctoral fellowship at the University of Maryland School of Medicine (1988-1991).

Yuan began his academic career as a Research Assistant Professor of Medicine at the University of Maryland School of Medicine (1993-1998) where he established a translational research project using lung tissues and cells isolated from patients with idiopathic pulmonary arterial hypertension to study pathogenic mechanisms of the disease. He received a Parker B. Francis Fellowship from the Francis Families Foundation in 1994 and a Giles F. Filley Memorial Award for Excellence in Respiratory Physiology and Medicine from the American Physiological Society in 1995 for his translational research work. He was also the Winner of the 1995 Cournand and Comroe Young Investigator Award of the American Heart Association. In 1998, Yuan obtained an Established Investigator Award from the American Heart Association for his pioneer work in identifying novel therapeutic approaches for pulmonary vascular disease. He was recognized as one of the highly promising young investigators in the translational research field of pulmonary vascular disease and right heart failure. In 1999, Yuan moved to the University of California, San Diego and became a Professor in 2003. His research interest was then extended to study pathogenic and therapeutic mechanisms of chronic thromboembolic pulmonary hypertension, functional role of ion channels in stem cell proliferation and differentiation, and pharmacogenetics associated with idiopathic and associated pulmonary arterial hypertension. While at the University of California, San Diego, he was the Vice Chair for Research of the Department of Medicine (2007-2010) and Associate Director for Research Training in the Division of Pulmonary and Critical Care Medicine (2003-2010).  In July, 2010, Yuan moved to the University of Illinois at Chicago to assume a position of Program Director in the newly established Institute for Personalized Respiratory Medicine (2010-2014). He was also Vice Chair for Scholarly Activities of the Department of Medicine at the College of Medicine and Director of the Program in Pulmonary Vascular Disease and Right Heart Dysfunction at the Center for Cardiovascular Research in the University of Illinois at Chicago.  In May, 2010, he was appointed Associate Vice President for Translational Health Sciences of the University of Arizona. At the same time, he became the founding Chief of the Division of Translational and Regenerative Medicine at the Department of Medicine of the College of Medicine.

His pulmonary vascular disease research propels the field on pathogenic roles of membrane receptors and ion channels and provides a new research direction for developing therapeutic approaches for the disease. He has been continuously funded by the NIH since 1993 when he received his FIRST award.

Yuan is a Fellow of the American Heart Association, the American Association for the Advancement of Science, and the American Physiological Society. He is also a Guggenheim Fellow. He is an elected Member of the American Society for Clinical Investigation and the Association of American Physicians. Yuan has served on many advisory committees and editorial boards, including Chair of the Respiratory Integrative Biology and Translational Research study section of the National Institutes of Health (NIH), and Chair of the Pulmonary Circulation Assembly of the American Thoracic Society. He is currently a regular member of the Vascular Cell and Molecular Biology study section of the NIH, Editor-in-Chief of the journal Pulmonary Circulation, and Associate Editor of the American Journal of Physiology Cell Physiology

He is the leading editor of a comprehensive reference book in the field of pulmonary circulation, Textbook of Pulmonary Vascular Disease (Springer, New York, NY, 2011) and an editor or co-editor of the following books: Hypoxic Pulmonary Vasoconstriction: Cellular and Molecular Mechanisms (Kluwer Academic Publishers, Boston, MA, 2004); Ion Channels in the Pulmonary Vasculature (Taylor & Francis Group, Boca Raton, FL, 2005); Membrane Receptors, Channels, and Transporters in Pulmonary Circulation (Humana Press-Springer, New York, NY, 2010); Advances in the Management of Pulmonary Arterial Hypertension (Future Medicine, London, UK. 2013); and Lung Stem Cells in the Epithelium and Vasculature (Humana Press/Springer Cham Heidelberg New York Dordrecht London, 2015). He is a co-author (with Kim Barrett, Susan Barman and Heddwen Brooks) of Ganong’s Review of Medical Physiology (26th edition) (McGraw Hill Education/Chicago, 2019).

Honors 

Yuan has received over 20 citations and awards:
1993	Dr. C.W. Dunker Award, Society of Chinese Biophysicists in America; Molecular Kinetics Award, Molecular Kinetics, Inc.
1994	Parker B. Francis Fellowship, The Francis Families Foundation
1995 	Giles F. Filley Memorial Award for Excellence in Respiratory Physiology and Medicine, The American Physiological Society
1995	Research Career Enhancement Award, The American Physiological Society
1995	Winner, Cournand and Comroe Young Investigator Award, American Heart Association
1996	Best Abstract Award, American Heart Association
1998	Established Investigator Award, American Heart Association
1998	Harold Lamport Award, The American Physiological Society
2000- 	Fellow, The American Physiological Society
2003- 	Fellow, American Heart Association
2004	Nominating Committee Chair Award, American Thoracic Society
2005	Mentor Recognition Award, University of California, San Diego
2006	Planning Committee Chair Award, American Thoracic Society
2007- 	Elected Member, The American Society for Clinical Investigation (ASCI)
2007	Program Committee Chair Award, American Thoracic Society
2007	Star Reviewer for 2006, The American Physiological Society (American Journal of Physiology. Lung Cellular and Molecular Physiology)
2007- 	Fellow, American Association for the Advancement of Science (AAAS)
2008	Guggenheim Fellowship Award (Guggenheim Fellow), John Simon Guggenheim Memorial Foundation, New York, NY
2008	Program Committee Chair Award, American Thoracic Society
2008	The UK-US Stem Cell Collaboration Development Award, UK Science & Innovation, Foreign and Commonwealth Office, British Consulate General, San Francisco, CA
2011	University Scholar Award, University of Illinois at Chicago
2011	Estelle Grover Lecturer, Grover Conference, American Thoracic Society (Lost Valley Ranch in Sedalia, CO; September 8, 2011)
2012	PVRI Achievement Award, Pulmonary Vascular Research Institute(Cape Town, South Africa, February 9, 2012)
2013- 	Elected Member, Association of American Physicians(AAP)
2013 	Research Administration Volunteer Recognition Award, American Heart Association
2017   Kenneth D. Bloch Memorial Lecturer, American Heart Association
2008   Robert M. Berne Distinguished Lectureship, The American Physiological Society

External links
Jason X.-J. Yuan c.v.

Journal Articles
 Google Scholar citations

References 

Living people
University of Maryland, Baltimore faculty
University of Illinois Chicago faculty
1963 births
Translational medicine
University of California, San Diego faculty
University of Arizona faculty
Members of the American Society for Clinical Investigation